DNA polymerase eta (Pol η), is a protein that in humans is encoded by the POLH gene.

DNA polymerase eta is a eukaryotic DNA polymerase involved in the DNA repair by translesion synthesis. The gene encoding DNA polymerase eta is POLH, also known as XPV, because loss of this gene results in the disease xeroderma pigmentosum.  Polymerase eta is particularly important for allowing accurate translesion synthesis of DNA damage resulting from ultraviolet radiation or UV.

Function 

This gene encodes a member of the Y family of specialized DNA polymerases. It copies undamaged DNA with a lower fidelity than other DNA-directed polymerases. However, it accurately replicates UV-damaged DNA; when thymine dimers are present, this polymerase inserts the complementary nucleotides in the newly synthesized DNA, thereby bypassing the lesion and suppressing the mutagenic effect of UV-induced DNA damage. This polymerase is thought to be involved in hypermutation during immunoglobulin class switch recombination.

Bypass of 8-oxoguanine

During DNA replication of the Saccharomyces cerevisiae chromosome, the oxidative DNA damage 8-oxoguanine triggers a switch to translesion synthesis by DNA polymerase eta.  This polymerase replicates 8-oxoguanine with an accuracy (insertion of a cytosine opposite the 8-oxoguanine) of approximately 94%.  Replication of 8-oxoguanine in the absence of DNA polymerase eta is less than 40%.

Clinical significance 

Mutations in this gene result in XPV, a variant type of xeroderma pigmentosum, characterized by sun sensitivity, elevated incidence of skin cancer, and at the cellular level, by delayed replication and hypermutability after UV-irradiation

Interactions 

POLH has been shown to interact with PCNA.

References

Further reading

External links 
  GeneReviews/NIH/NCBI/UW entry on Xeroderma Pigmentosum

DNA replication
DNA-binding proteins